Burdis is a surname. Notable people with the surname include

 Ray Burdis (born 1959), English actor, screenwriter, director, and film producer
 Mark Burdis (born  1968), English actor

See also
 Burdi (disambiguation)